Lieut-Colonel Herbert Walker FRIBA, M Inst CE, FSI, (1846 - 23 November 1937) was an architect, surveyor and civil engineer based in Nottingham from 1870 to 1923.

Life
He was born in 1846, the son of George Frederick Walker (1800 - 1857) and Eliza Dutton (1807 - 1875).

He studied in the office of his brother Samuel Dutton Walker from 1860 - 1866. He was then articled to Borough Engineer Marriott Ogle Tarbotton from 1866 - 1870 and was engineer and surveyor to Basford Sanitary Authority. When Basford was merged with Nottingham he started his own practice in Nottingham in 1870. He had offices in Newcastle Chambers on Angel Row until around 1907 when he moved to Albion Chambers in King Street.

He was appointed a Fellow of the Royal Institute of British Architects in 1889.

He married Annie Sophia Turner, youngest daughter of John Turner of Edwalton, on 25 January 1872 at Holy Rood Church, Edwalton and they had the following children:
Ethel Walker (b. 1873)
Mabel Elizabeth Walker (b. 1878)
Herbert Spencer Walker (1882 - 1906)
Frederick Turner Walker (1883 - 1941)
Marion Walker (b. 1884)
Dorothy Annie Walker (1889 - 1909)
Kathleen Marjorie Walker (b. 1892)
Geoffrey Dutton Walker (became Manchester City Surveyor)

Until 1886 he lived in a house called Church Fields, in Bailey Street, Old Basford.

He spent about 37 years with the Robin Hood Battalion which he joined in 1864 as a cadet. He retired with the rank of Lieut-Colonel. During the First World War he undertook recruiting work and was appointed inspector of machinery for the Royal Engineers.

For seven years, he was church warden at Emmanuel Church, Nottingham.

On retiring from business in 1923 he moved to Blackpool. His wife predeceased him by ten years and he died on 23 November 1937.

Works
Basford Cemetery, chapel and porter’s lodge. 1874
Board Schools, Mansfield Road, Sherwood 1878
Entrance Lodge, Basford Workhouse 1880 
Daybrook Brewery 1881
Villa Residence for James Acton, Goodwood House, Cross Street, Red Hill, Nottingham 1882. Demolished 1965.
House and shop for Reuben Walker, Basford 1882
Beeston Sewerage Works 1882-1883
Boulevard Hotel, Radford Boulevard , Nottingham 1883
Jacoby and Co Lace Factory, Daybrook, Nottingham 1883 - 1884
Beeston Cemetery and Chapel, Wollaton Road, Beeston 1886
Blidworth Waterworks 1889
John Robinson Almshouses, Mansfield Road, Sherwood, Nottingham 1889
Nottingham Castle restoration of kitchen wall 1889-1891
Waterworks Office, Castle Boulevard, Nottingham 1899-1900
Burton Joyce Pumping Station, 1899 - 1900 
Primitive Methodist Church, Westgate, Sleaford 1906-1907 (demolished 1964)

References

1846 births
1937 deaths
Architects from Nottingham
Fellows of the Royal Institute of British Architects
British Army personnel of World War I
Sherwood Foresters officers